Laurie Ann Brand (born February 25, 1956) is a professor of international relations at the University of Southern California School of International Relations.  Professor Brand specializes in the international relations of the Middle East, including political economy of the region and inter-Arab relations.  She received her B.S. in French from Georgetown University, her M.A. in International Affairs from Columbia University, and her Ph.D. in Comparative Politics from the same institution. She served as president of Middle East Studies Association of North America in 2004.

Publications

References

1956 births
Living people
Georgetown College (Georgetown University) alumni
School of International and Public Affairs, Columbia University alumni
University of Southern California faculty
American women political scientists
American political scientists
American women academics
21st-century American women